Glass Houses is a 1922 American silent comedy film directed by Harry Beaumont and starring Viola Dana, Gaston Glass and Mayme Kelso.

Cast
 Viola Dana as Joy Duval 
 Gaston Glass as Billy Norton 
 Mayme Kelso as Aunt Harriet 
 Helen Lynch as Cicily Duval 
 Claire Du Brey as Mrs. Vicky 
 Ellsworth Gage as Orville King 
 John Steppling as The Lawyer

References

Bibliography
 Munden, Kenneth White. The American Film Institute Catalog of Motion Pictures Produced in the United States, Part 1. University of California Press, 1997.

External links

1922 films
1922 comedy films
Silent American comedy films
Films directed by Harry Beaumont
American silent feature films
1920s English-language films
American black-and-white films
Metro Pictures films
1920s American films